The 1994 FIBA Africa Championship for Women was the 13th FIBA Africa Championship for Women, played under the rules of FIBA, the world governing body for basketball, and the FIBA Africa thereof. The tournament was hosted by South Africa from December 10 to 17, 1994.

Zaire defeated Senegal 68–48 in the final to win their third title  and secure a berth at the 1996 Summer Olympics.

Draw

Preliminary round

Group A

Group B

Knockout stage

Semifinals

7th place match

5th place match

Bronze medal match

Final

Final standings

Awards

External links
Official Website

References

1994
1994 in South African sport
1994 in African basketball
1994 in women's basketball
International basketball competitions hosted by South Africa